The 2022–23 Perth Scorchers Women's season was the eighth in the team's history. Coached by Shelley Nitschke and captained by Sophie Devine, the Scorchers entered WBBL08 as defending champions after claiming their maiden title in WBBL07. They finished the regular season in fifth position and consequently failed to qualify for the finals.

Squad 
Each 2022–23 squad was made up of 15 active players. Teams could sign up to five 'marquee players', with a maximum of three of those from overseas. Marquees were defined as any overseas player, or a local player who holds a Cricket Australia national contract at the start of the WBBL|08 signing period.

Personnel changes made ahead of the season included:

 Heather Graham departed the Scorchers, signing with the Hobart Hurricanes.
 Holly Ferling signed with the Scorchers, having previously played for the Brisbane Heat, Melbourne Stars and Melbourne Renegades.
 Maddy Darke signed with the Scorchers, having previously played for the Sydney Sixers and Melbourne Stars.
 Sri Lankan marquee Chamari Athapaththu did not re-sign with the Scorchers.
 New Zealand marquee Maddy Green signed with the Scorchers, having previously played for the Brisbane Heat.

The table below lists the Scorchers players and their key stats (including runs scored, batting strike rate, wickets taken, economy rate, catches and stumpings) for the season.

Ladder

Fixtures 

All times are AEDT.

Statistics and awards
 Most runs: Beth Mooney – 434 (1st in the league)
 Highest score in an innings: Beth Mooney – 99* (58) vs Sydney Sixers, 5 November 2022
 Most wickets: Alana King – 17 (12th in the league)
 Best bowling figures in an innings: Lilly Mills – 3/9 (2 overs) vs Melbourne Renegades, 20 November 2022
 Most catches (fielder): Maddy Green – 10 (6th in the league)
 Player of the Match awards:
 Beth Mooney – 3
 Sophie Devine, Amy Edgar, Maddy Green – 1 each
WBBL|08 Player of the Tournament: Beth Mooney (equal 3rd)
WBBL|08 Team of the Tournament: Beth Mooney

References

Further reading

 

2022–23 Women's Big Bash League season by team
Perth Scorchers (WBBL)